André Nicolaevitch Grabar (July 26, 1896 – October 5, 1990) was an historian of Romanesque art and the art of the Eastern Roman Empire and the Bulgarian Empire. Born in Ukraine and educated in Kyiv, Saint Petersburg and Odesa, he spent his career in Bulgaria (1919–1922), France (1922–1958) and the United States (1958–1990), and wrote all his papers in French. Grabar was one of the 20th-century founders of the study of the art and icons of the Eastern Roman Empire, adopting a synthetic approach embracing history, theology and interactions with the Islamic world.

His son Oleg Grabar also became an art historian, with a special interest in Islamic art and architecture.

Life
André Nicolaevitch Grabar was born in Ukraine on July 26, 1896, at Kiev in Kiev Governorate part of the Russian Empire (now Kyiv, Ukraine). He was educated in Kyiv and at first thought of becoming an artist, joining the studio of a Kyiv painter on leaving school. Deciding that he did not have sufficient talent he turned to the study of art history, although he remained an amateur painter. He began his university studies in Kyiv, moving to St. Petersburg (then known as Petrograd) in 1915. While there he began to think about the connection between religious life and art, which would become his life's work. Discussing the connection between the Orthodox Christian faith and conservative aesthetics of the creators of Christian icons, Grabar explained, "Their role can be compared to that of musical performers in our day, who do not feel that their importance is diminished by the fact that they limit their talent to the interpretation of other people's work, since each interpretation contains original nuances." He left St. Petersburg in November 1917, a few days after the Bolsheviks seized power in the October Revolution, and completed his studies at Odessa, Ukraine, in 1919.

Grabar realized it would not be possible for him to pursue his career in what was becoming the Soviet Union and he left for Sofia, Bulgaria in January 1920. He spent three years surveying the medieval monuments of the country for the National Museum, often in "harsh conditions". He took many trips through the countryside, often by donkey or on foot.

He moved to Strasbourg, France in 1922, first teaching the Russian language. He married Julie Ivanova (whom he had met in Bulgaria) in 1923; she was a medical doctor. He earned a Ph. D. at the University of Strasbourg in 1928, and taught art history there until 1937. He wrote his books in the French language, but many of his more than 30 titles were translated into English and other languages.

From 1937 to 1958 he became the center of a school of young art historians, as a Director of Studies in Christian Archaeology at the Ecole Pratique des Hautes Etudes (1937–1946) and as a professor at the Collège de France (1946–1958).

In 1958 Grabar  moved to the United States, becoming a central figure at the Dumbarton Oaks Institute of Harvard University. He was a research professor at Dumbarton Oaks from 1950 to 1964. In 1961 he gave the A. W. Mellon lectures in the Fine Arts at the National Gallery of Art in Washington, DC, published as Christian Iconography: A Study of Its Origins (1968).  He became a member of the American Academy of Arts and Sciences.

He died in Paris on October 5, 1990.

His son Oleg Grabar (1929–2011) was also a historian of art, specializing in Islamic art. He also had another son named Nicolas.

Andre Grabar's papers are part of the Dumbarton Oaks collection.

Selected works
 L'Eglise de Boiana (1924)
 La peinture religieuse en Bulgarie (1928)
 Recherche sur les Influences Orientales dans l'Art Balkanique (1928)
 La Sainte Face de Laon (1936)
 Martyrium (1943, 1946)
 La Peinture byzantine (1953)
 Byzantine Painting: Historical and Critical Study (1953. Geneva: Skira)
 L'Iconoclasme (1957)
 Early Medieval Painting from the Fourth to the Eleventh Century: Mosaics and Mural Painting (1957. New York: Skira)
 Ampoules de Terre Sainte (Monza, Bobbio) (1958. Paris, C. Klincksieck) (The standard monograph, with 61 photographs and 70 pages of commentary.) (See Leroy review, below.)
 Romanesque Painting from the Eleventh to the Thirteenth Century (1958. New York: Skira)
 The Treasures of Venice. Michelangelo Murano and André Grabar (1963), Editions d'Art Albert Skira, Geneva, 218 pp. 
 Byzantine and Early Medieval Painting (1965. New York: Viking Press)
 The Beginnings of Christian Art, 200–395 (=Arts of Mankind; 9) (1967. London: Thames & Hudson)
 Christian Iconography: a Study of its Origins, A.W. Mellon Lectures in the Fine Arts, 1961. (1968. Princeton, NJ: Princeton U.P.)
 Leroy, Jules, Review of André Grabar Les Ampoules de Terre Sainte], Syria. Archéologie, Art et histoire, Vol 36, 1959 (in French)

See also

 Christianity in the 3rd century#Early iconography
 Cross-in-square
 Monza ampullae

Notes

Further reading
Maguire, Henry. 'André Grabar, 1896–1990', in Dumbarton Oaks Papers''; 45 (1991), pp. xii–xv [https://www.jstor.org/stable/1291687 JSTOR

External links
 Dictionary of Art Historians: André Grabar

Writers from Kyiv
1896 births
1990 deaths
American art historians
French art historians
Harvard University faculty
Winners of the Prix Broquette-Gonin (literature)
Ukrainian art historians
White Russian emigrants to Bulgaria
French male non-fiction writers
Emigrants from the Russian Empire to Bulgaria
Corresponding Fellows of the Medieval Academy of America
Recipients of the Pour le Mérite (civil class)
20th-century French male writers
Corresponding Fellows of the British Academy
Historians of Byzantine art